Short Circuit is a 1935 British comedy play by Alec Coppel. It was his first produced play.

Premise
A fair of adulterous lovers have troubles.

Original Cast
Cecil Humphreys as Robert Winton
Iris Baker as Julia Winter
Anthony Ireland as Deryk Bryce
Ernest Jay as Mr Simpson
Pamela Carme as Constance Bryce
Ian MacDonald as Mr Hopkins
Frederick Annerley as Fraser
John Kentish as Lloyd

Reception
Reviewing the original 1935 production The Obsever disliked the first act but enjoyed the second act.

References

1935 in theatre
1935 plays
West End plays
Plays by Alec Coppel